Verkhny Alyshtan (Ürge Alaştan) is a rural locality (a village) and the administrative centre of Bulyakayevsky Selsoviet, Fyodorovsky District, Bashkortostan, Russia. The population was 351 as of 2010. There are 2 streets.

Geography 
Verkhny Alyshtan is located 15 km north of Fyodorovka (the district's administrative centre) by road. Nizhny Alyshtan is the nearest rural locality.

References 

Rural localities in Fyodorovsky District